Marlow Lagoon is an outer western suburb of Palmerston 24 km SE of the Darwin CBD. Its local government area is the City of Palmerston. Marlow Lagoon is bounded to the west by the Adelaide-Darwin Railway, and to the east by Elrundie Ave.

The suburb is named after Joseph Marlow, a railway maintenance worker who had an interest in an agricultural lease (no. 213) spanning the nearby peninsula between Berrimah and Palmerston. .

References

External links
https://web.archive.org/web/20110629040718/http://www.nt.gov.au/lands/lis/placenames/origins/greaterdarwin.shtml#m#m

Suburbs of Darwin, Northern Territory